Senator Matthews may refer to:

Members of the United States Senate
Eric Matthews (Boy Meets World), fictional character from the TV series Boy Meets World, who becomes a U.S. Senator
Harlan Mathews (1927–2014), U.S. Senator from Tennessee from 1993 to 1994
Stanley Matthews (judge) (1824–1889), U.S. Senator from Ohio from 1877 to 1879

United States state senate members
John W. Matthews Jr. (born 1940), South Carolina Senate
Kevin Matthews (politician) (born 1960), Oklahoma State Senate
Margie Bright Matthews (born 1963), South Carolina State Senate
A. G. Mathews (1872–1958), West Virginia State Senate
Andrew Mathews (politician) (fl. 2010s), Minnesota State Senate
Bernice Mathews (born 1933), Nevada State Senate
Earl C. Mathews (1879–1953), Virginia State Senate
James Mathews (American politician) (1805–1887), Ohio State Senate
Milton W. Mathews (1846–1892), Illinois State Senate
Sampson Mathews (1737–1807), Virginia State Senate
Vincent Mathews (1766–1846), New York State Senate